Stefano Bortolussi (Milan, 24 February 1959) is a writer, poet and translator of Italian.

Biography
The translator of some of the principal authors of Anglo-American contemporary fiction, including James Ellroy, John Irving, Edward Bunker, Stephen King, Cathleen Schine, James Lee Burke, Bill Bryson, Richard Price, John Connolly, Nicholas Evans, John Katzenbach, Frederick Forsyth and so on.

He made his debut as a poet and his poems have been published in literary magazines " CountDown ", " VersoDove 'and' Scheme ', and subsequently in the collection. In 2010, his poem The wave of the search was included in the anthology Bona Vox ( Jaca Book ), edited by Robert Mussapi .

His debut as a novelist takes place even before the United States than in Italy. In 2003 he was in fact published by the editice Lawrence Ferlinghetti of City Lights Head Above Water, translated by Anne Milano Appel, in the series "Italian Voices", which won the 23rd Northern California Book Award and arrives among the finalists for the PEN Center Literary Award; out in 2004 in the Italian publisher Pequod with the title, Out of the water. Here are two more novels and two children's stories written under a pseudonym

References
Stefano Bortolussi on OPAC SBN
about Stefano Bortolussi
Stefano Bortolussi

1959 births
Living people